Renée Ferrer de Arréllaga (born 19 May 1944) is a contemporary Paraguayan poet and novelist.  She is Secretary General of the Board of Governors of the twenty-member Academia Paraguaya de la Lengua Española.  Her novel Los nudos del silencio (The knots of silence) has been translated into French, Italian, and English. On 16 December 2011, Ferrer was awarded Paraguay's National Prize for Literature by President Fernando Lugo. She is married with four children.

Works by Ferrer

 Poetistas del Paraguay (Voces de hoy), Miguel Ángel Fernández, Renée Ferrer de Arréllaga, 
 Entre el ropero y el tren, Asuncion, Ediciones Alta Voz, 2004
 Itinerario del deseo (Itinerary of desire), translated by Betsy Partyka, Ediciones Alta Voz, 2002
 La colección de relojes, Asuncion, Arandura, 2001
 Renee Ferrer : poesia completa hasta el ano 2000,  Asuncion, Paraguay : Arandura Editorial, 2000
 El ocaso del milenio, Asuncion, Paraguay : Ediciones y Arte S.R.L., 1999
 Vagos sin tierra, Asuncion, Expolibro, 1999
 Viaje a destiempo, Universidad Católica Nuestra Señora de la Asunción ; Biblioteca de Estudios Paraguayos, 1989
 De la eternidad y otros delirios, Asuncion, Intercontinental Editora, 1997
 El resplandor y las sombras, Asuncion, Arandura Editorial, 1996
 Itinerario del deseo, Asuncion, Arandura Editorial, 1995
 Desde el encendido corazón del monte, Asuncion, Arandura Editorial, 1994
 Narrativa paraguaya actual : dos vertientes, Encuentros, no.4 (March 1994), pp. 1–16
 Por el ojo de la cerradura, Asuncion, Arandura Editorial, 1993
 El Acantilado y el mar, Asuncion, Arandura Editorial, 1992
 Los nudos del silencio, Asuncion, Arte Nuevo Editores, 1988
 Sobreviviente, Editiones Torremozas, Madrid, 1988, 
 Nocturnos, Asuncion, Editorial Arte Nuevo, 1987
 La mariposa azul y otros cuentos, Asuncion, Ediciones IDAP, Ediciones Mediterráneo, 1987
 La Seca y otros cuentos, Asuncion, El Lector, 1986
 Campo y cielo, Asuncion, Ediciones Mediterráneo, 1985
 Peregrino de la eternidad, Asuncion, Alcándara Editora, 1985
 Desde el Cañadón de la memoria, Hamburg, Imprenta Paul Molnar, 1984
 Cascarita de nuez, Asuncion, Talleres de Artes Gráficas Zamphirópolos, 1978
 Voces sin Réplica,  Renée Ferrer Alfaro, Asuncion, 1967
 Hay surcos que no se llenan, Renée Ferrer Alfaro, Asuncion, Editorial El Arte, 1965
 La expansión colonizadora y la fundación de Concepción

Works about Ferrer
 Las andanzas de un anhelo / Renee Ferrer, Angeles Molto Moreno, Asuncion, Criterio Ediciones, 2003
 Reneé Ferrer. Los muros del silencio,  in Narradoras paraguayas, an anthology edited by José Vicente Peiró, Guido Rodríguez Alcalá, Asuncion, Expolibro, 1999
 Desmenuzando cuentos, de Renée Ferrer, by Delfina Acosta. Asuncion, Arandura Editorial, 2002.
 La temática femenina en antología de cuentos de Renée Ferrer, by José Antonio Alonso Navarro.
 Renée Ferrer. In Reflexiones, ensayos sobre escritoras hispanoamericanas, Ed: Dr. Priscilla Gac-Artigas.

References

External links
Exégesis review of Los Nudos del Silencio (in Spanish)
Renee Ferrer recorded at the Library of Congress for the Hispanic Division’s audio literary archive on 24 May 2001

1944 births
Living people
Paraguayan women novelists
Paraguayan women poets
20th-century Paraguayan poets
20th-century novelists
21st-century Paraguayan poets
21st-century novelists
20th-century Paraguayan women writers
21st-century Paraguayan women writers